VFL can refer to:

Sport
 Victorian Football League, an Australian rules football league, predecessor of the Australian Football League
 Victorian Football League, an Australian rules football league; formerly the Victorian Football Association, renamed in 1995
Verein für Leibesübungen
VfL-Stadium, a stadium in Wolfburg

Other
Voies Ferrées des Landes, historic French railway company of Gascony